Entoloma  is a large genus of terrestrial pink-gilled mushrooms, with about 1,000 species.  Most have a drab appearance, pink gills which are attached to the stem, a smooth thick cap, and angular spores.  Many entolomas are saprobic but some are mycorrhizal. The best-known member of the genus is the livid agaric (Entoloma sinuatum), responsible for a number of poisonings over the years in Europe and North America, and Entoloma rhodopolium in Japan. Some southern hemisphere species such as Entoloma rodwayi and Entoloma viridomarginatum from Australia, and Entoloma hochstetteri from New Zealand, are very colourful, with caps of unusual shades of green and blue-green. Most entolomas are dull shades of olive, brown, or grey.

Etymology 
The part ἐντός means "within, inside". The part "loma" is a noun-forming element derived from Greek λῶμ(α), "fringe, hem" and used in the botanical taxonomy for naming plants distinguished by having a fringe or hem or particular kind described by the initial part of the word. In the case of Entoloma, the term refers to mushrooms with the hem turned inside.

Taxonomic history

The name is derived from the Greek entos (ἐντός) meaning inner and lóma (λῶμα) meaning fringe from the in-rolled margin. The Swedish mycologist Elias Magnus Fries classified all pink-spored gilled fungi in a series Hyporhodius within his large genus Agaricus, subdividing into five tribes based on cap shape, gills and size in 1821. He later refined this in 1838, placing those with universal veils into tribe Volvaria, those with free gills and a discrete stipe into tribe Pluteus, those with a Tricholoma-like shape into tribe Entoloma, and those with a depressed cap and decurrent gills into tribe Clitopilus. The small tribe Leptonia had convex fleshy membranaceous caps, the tribe Nolanea,  were slender fungi with bell-shaped caps and hollow stems, and lastly tribe Eccilia had umblicilate caps and adnate gills. Paul Kummer raised Entoloma, Nolanea, Leptonia and Eccilia to genus-level in 1871, though Lucien Quélet created a new genus Rhodophyllus uniting all those fungi with pinkish-red adnate or sinuate gills and angular spores, similar in scope to the original Hyporhodius. The two classifications coexisted until recently, with those taxonomists favoring a broader genus concept following Quélet, and the others Kummer. French mycologist Henri Romagnesi took up study of the genus in what was to last over forty years, describing new species and creating a new infrageneric classification making it one of the most studied and best known agaric genera to date. Over time, more authors and texts have followed Kummer.

The genus, as strictly defined, appears to be polyphyletic when looking at data produced by the molecular study by Moncalvo in 2002, with species of Nolanea, Leptonia and Inocephalus interspersed with various Entoloma species in a broadly monophyletic entolomatoid group.

Ecology
Most species are saprobic, though some may form mycorrhizal relationships. They may be found in a wide variety of habitats, including grasslands, woodlands, peat-bogs and moors, and Arctic or alpine conditions. Several species including Entoloma saepium, E. clypeatum, E. aprile and E. saundersii are thought to form mycorrhizal relationships with members of the Rosaceae including Malus, Pyrus, Crataegus and Prunus.

Distribution
Entolomas are found the world over, from the equator to polar regions. Some Arctic species are circumpolar in their distribution. Others are widely distributed and some, such as E. sericeum and E. incanum may have been spread by man.

Toxicity
Although some of the spring entolomas, such as E. clypeatum, are consumed, especially in Europe, edibility is unknown for many species, and some are definitely poisonous and dangerous.  E. rhodopolium has been found to contain significant quantities of the mycotoxin muscarine. Most entolomas are very difficult to identify, but Entoloma abortivum is edible.

References

External links
 Mushroom Expert - The genus Entoloma
 Tom Volk's Fungi of the Month - Entoloma abortivum

Entolomataceae
Agaricales genera
Taxa named by Elias Magnus Fries